Richard R. Burton is an American computer scientist at Acuitus, who previously worked at Bolt Beranek and Newman, and Xerox PARC.  A charter Fellow of the ACM, he was awarded their Software System Award in 1994 for his contributions to Interlisp.

References

American computer scientists
Year of birth missing (living people)
Living people